Cognat-Lyonne is a commune in the department of Allier in Auvergne-Rhône-Alpes in central France.

Population

Government 
List of successive mayors:
 1919-1945: Étienne Pélisson
 1945-1971: Lucien Riet
 1971-1977: Pierre Gillet
 1977-1983: André Goutheraud
 1983-1989: Raymond Mazal
 1989-unknown: André Goutheraud
 2001-current: Raymond Mazal

Culture & Heritage 
 Sainte-Radegonde church (12th century): Historical Monument
 Lyonne castle (18th century) built by Robert de Lyonne
 Rilhat castle

See also
Communes of the Allier department

References

Communes of Allier
Allier communes articles needing translation from French Wikipedia